Leggatt may refer to:

People 
Alison Leggatt (1904–1990), English character actress
Francis Leggatt Chantrey (1781–1841), English sculptor of the Georgian era
George Leggatt (born 1957), Lord Leggatt, Justice of the Supreme Court of the United Kingdom
Graham Leggat (1934–2015), also known as Graham Leggat, former Scottish international football player
Herbert Leggatt (1868–1946), international rugby union player for Scotland in the 1890s
Ian Leggatt (born 1965), Canadian professional golfer
Stuart Leggatt (1931–2002), Canadian politician and judge
William Leggatt DSO (1894–1968), MC, Australian soldier, lawyer and politician

Places 
Leggatt, Ontario, also known as East Luther-Grand Valley, a township in the Canadian province of Ontario
Leggatt Island, part of the Great Barrier Reef Marine Park, the easternmost island in the Cole Islands group, Queensland, Australia

See also
Legate (disambiguation)
Legget
Leggett (disambiguation)
Leggit